Lenore A. Grenoble is an American linguist specializing in Slavic and Arctic Indigenous languages, currently the John Matthews Manly Distinguished Service Professor and Chair at University of Chicago.

Grenoble earned her Ph.D. in Slavic Linguistics at University of California, Berkeley. Her research is primarily concerned with endangered languages. She was elected to serve as the Secretary-Treasurer of the Linguistic Society of America for a five-year term from 2018 to 2023. In 2018, Grenoble was awarded a Guggenheim Fellowship for her work in Linguistics.

She was elected to the American Academy of Arts and Sciences in 2017.

Selected works 
 Diana Forker & Lenore A. Grenoble (eds.) 2021. Language Contact in the Territory of the Former Soviet Union. Amsterdam: John Benjamins Press.
 Balthasar Bickel, David A. Peterson, Lenore A. Grenoble & Alan Timberlake (eds.) 2013. Language Typology and Historical Contingency. Amsterdam: John Benjamins Press.
 Lenore A. Grenoble & N. Louanna Furbee (eds.)  2010. Language Documentation: Practices and Values. Amsterdam: John Benjamins Press.
 Lenore A. Grenoble & Lindsay J. Whaley. 2006.  Saving Languages. An Introduction to Language Revitalization. Cambridge: Cambridge University Press.
 Lenore A. Grenoble. 2003. Language Policy in the Former Soviet Union. Dordrecht: Kluwer Academic Press.
 Nadezhda Ja. Bulatova & Lenore A. Grenoble. 1999.  Evenki. Languages of the World Materials/141.  Munich: Lincom.
 Lenore A. Grenoble & Lindsay J. Whaley (eds.) 1998. Endangered Languages: Current Issues and Future Prospects. Cambridge: Cambridge University Press.
 Lenore A. Grenoble. 1998. Deixis and Information Packaging in Russian Discourse. Pragmatics & Beyond, 50. Amsterdam: John Benjamins Press.
 Lenore A. Grenoble & John M. Kopper (eds.) 1997. Essays in the Art and Theory of Translation. Lewiston, NY: Edwin Mellen Press.

References

Year of birth missing (living people)
Living people
University of Chicago faculty
Linguists from the United States
University of California, Berkeley alumni
Fellows of the American Academy of Arts and Sciences
20th-century linguists
21st-century linguists
Women linguists